Biziura is a genus of stiff-tailed ducks endemic to Australasia and containing one living and one subfossil species.

Species

 †B. delautouri Forbes, 1892 – New Zealand musk duck – previously endemic to New Zealand, and occurring on both North and South Islands, but now extinct.

References

Bird genera
Bird genera with one living species
Oxyurinae